Klaus-Dieter Dewinski (born 31 August 1950) is a retired German football defender.

References

External links
 

1950 births
Living people
German footballers
Bundesliga players
2. Bundesliga players
VfL Bochum players
Bonner SC players
Würzburger Kickers players
Association football defenders